Aroga websteri is a moth of the family Gelechiidae. It is found in North America, where it has been recorded from Washington.

The wingspan is 14–16 mm. The forewings are sordid white, heavily stuffed with greyish-fuscous and overlying greyish-fuscous scales. The extreme base and two or three short, ill-defined, oblique costal dashes are blackish fuscous. There is a blackish-fuscous longitudinal dash on the lower fold, nearly to the middle of the wing, with a few ochreous scales mixed. A shorter dash is found in the cell at the middle, followed by an ill-defined small spot of the same colour. The hindwings are light smoky fuscous.

Etymology
The species is named for Dr. R. L. Webster, former head of the Department of Zoology, Washington State College.

References

Moths described in 1942
Aroga
Moths of North America